Chuchel is a village in the Havlíčkův Brod District, Vysočina Region, Czech Republic. It belongs administratively to the municipality of Jeřišno.  By around 1900, the settlement had 236 inhabitants, but today it has less than sixty permanent residents.

References

Neighbourhoods in the Czech Republic
Populated places in Havlíčkův Brod District